Punta Bagnà (in Italian) or Cime du Grand Vallon (in French) is a mountain of Savoie, France and of the Province of Turin, Italy. It lies in the Cottian Alps range. It has an elevation of 3,129 metres above sea level.

Etymology

The name used on the Italian maps comes from  Piedmontese "Bagnà" («wet»), which should derive from the look of the blackish fine ground nearby the summit. The French name comes from the "Grand Vallon", a secondary valley which starts from the mountain and goes northwards towards Charmaix and Modane.

Geography 
In the French subdivision of western Alps it belongs to the Massif du Mont-Cenis while in the SOIUSA (International Standardized Mountain Subdivision of the Alps) it is part of the mountain group called "gruppo della Pierre Menue" (Italian) or "groupe de l'Aiguille de Scolette" (French).

Administratively the mountain is divided between the Italian comune of Bardonecchia (southern face) and the French communes of Modane (north-western face) and Avrieux (north-eastern face).

Access to the summit 
The easiest route for the summit starts from col du Fréjus, which connects Modane and Bardonecchia, then passes by punta del Fréjus and follows the south-western ridge of the mountain.

Notes

Maps
 Italian official cartography (Istituto Geografico Militare - IGM); on-line version: www.pcn.minambiente.it
 French  official cartography (Institut Géographique National - IGN); on-line version:  www.geoportail.fr
 Istituto Geografico Centrale - Carta dei sentieri e dei rifugi scala 1:50.000 n. 1 Valli di Susa Chisone e Germanasca e 1:25.000 n. 104 Bardonecchia Monte Thabor Sauze d'Oulx

External links 
 Punta Bagnà: 360° panoramic image from the summit on pano.ica-net.it

Mountains of the Alps
Mountains of Savoie
Mountains of Piedmont
Alpine three-thousanders
France–Italy border
International mountains of Europe
Mountains partially in France
Mountains partially in Italy
Three-thousanders of France
Three-thousanders of Italy